Alcyonidiopsis  is a genus of pellet-filled trace fossil, often branching, known from the Ordovician, or possibly earlier, to the recent. It is associated with the quiet, deeper waters of the Nereites ichnofacies. The individual pellets that infill the burrow are sometimes referred to Tomaculum, though this practice is discouraged.

See also
Tubotomaculum,

References

Trace fossils